Christmas Tree Shops is an American chain of specialty retail stores headquartered in Sudbury, Massachusetts . As of 2021, the chain operates 80 stores in 20 U.S. states.

History 
In 1970, Charles Bilezikian and his wife, Doreen opened the first store in Yarmouth Port, MA on Cape Cod. The original location comprised three separate buildings: the Front Shop, the Back Shop and the Barn Shop (which mostly sold penny candy), hence the pluralization of the store's name. The first complex, which the Bilezikians lived above, was on Route 6A, and it was open seasonally in the spring through early fall.

Since the 1980s, the chain had slowly been expanding beyond Cape Cod. As of May 2014, the company had 83 stores in 18 states. Expansion for the chain has included stores in Michigan, Indiana, Kentucky, and Ohio. Its newest stores opened in Augusta, Georgia, Milwaukee, Wisconsin, Dallas, Texas, and Greensboro, North Carolina; the three opened under new ownership. The chain still has a strong presence on Cape Cod, where it operates six locations.

Christmas Tree Shops was acquired by Bed Bath & Beyond in 2003, though the Bilezikians remain involved in the executive operations. The original stores on Route 6A were closed in January 2007, though the site is now occupied by stores owned by the Bilezikians' son Greg. Some of the earlier Cape Cod stores, as in West Dennis, are dwarfed by recently built stores.

In November 2020, Bed Bath & Beyond sold all 80 locations of Christmas Tree Shops, "andThat!", and the Middleborough, Ma. distribution center to Handil Holdings, a private company, for an undisclosed amount.

Distribution center 
The company maintains a distribution center in Middleboro, Massachusetts.

Store concepts

Christmas Tree Shops

Christmas Tree Shops are bargain stores, selling food, toys, household furnishings, and Christmas decorations. Most stores typically resemble older buildings (Colonial, Victorian, or even Old English barn styles, such as in Sagamore and Pembroke, Massachusetts; and Warwick, Rhode Island). Some, such as the Lynnfield, Massachusetts store, are even more conceptualized; it is known for its lighthouse and fishing village motif.

Christmas Tree Shops also has several stores in enclosed shopping malls, such as inside the Holyoke Mall at Ingleside in Massachusetts, Colonie Center in Albany, New York, and Salmon Run Mall in Watertown, New York.

Christmas Tree Shops Express
"Christmas Tree Shops express" stores feature a smaller footprint; the merchandise mix is oriented towards seasonal offerings.

andThat!
"andThat!" is a new banner used to expand Christmas Tree Shops to other parts of the country not familiar with the concept in order to eliminate confusion. "andThat!" stores have opened in Virginia, Wisconsin, Michigan, New Jersey, Georgia, Delaware and Florida

References

External links 
 Christmas Tree Shops Website

Yarmouth, Massachusetts
Companies based in Barnstable County, Massachusetts
Economy of the Eastern United States
American companies established in 1970
Retail companies established in 1970
Retail companies of the United States
1970 establishments in Massachusetts
2003 mergers and acquisitions